Boron nitride is a thermally and chemically resistant refractory compound of boron and nitrogen with the chemical formula BN. It exists in various crystalline forms that are isoelectronic to a similarly structured carbon lattice. The hexagonal form corresponding to graphite is the most stable and soft among BN polymorphs, and is therefore used as a lubricant and an additive to cosmetic products. The cubic (zincblende aka sphalerite structure) variety analogous to diamond is called c-BN; it is softer than diamond, but its thermal and chemical stability is superior. The rare wurtzite BN modification is similar to lonsdaleite but slightly softer than the cubic form.

Because of excellent thermal and chemical stability, boron nitride ceramics are used in high-temperature equipment and metal casting. Boron nitride has potential use in nanotechnology.

Structure
Boron nitride exists in multiple forms that differ in the arrangement of the boron and nitrogen atoms, giving rise to varying bulk properties of the material.

Amorphous form (a-BN) 
The amorphous form of boron nitride (a-BN) is non-crystalline, lacking any long-distance regularity in the arrangement of its atoms. It is analogous to amorphous carbon.

All other forms of boron nitride are crystalline.

Hexagonal form (h-BN) 
The most stable crystalline form is the hexagonal one, also called h-BN, α-BN, g-BN, and graphitic boron nitride. Hexagonal boron nitride (point group = D6h; space group = P63/mmc) has a layered structure similar to graphite. Within each layer, boron and nitrogen atoms are bound by strong covalent bonds, whereas the layers are held together by weak van der Waals forces. The interlayer "registry" of these sheets differs, however, from the pattern seen for graphite, because the atoms are eclipsed, with boron atoms lying over and above nitrogen atoms. This registry reflects the local polarity of the B–N bonds, as well as interlayer N-donor/B-acceptor characteristics. Likewise, many metastable forms consisting of differently stacked polytypes exist. Therefore, h-BN and graphite are very close neighbors, and the material can accommodate carbon as a substituent element to form BNCs. BC6N hybrids have been synthesized, where carbon substitutes for some B and N atoms.

Cubic form (c-BN) 
Cubic boron nitride has a crystal structure analogous to that of diamond. Consistent with diamond being less stable than graphite, the cubic form is less stable than the hexagonal form, but the conversion rate between the two is negligible at room temperature, as it is for diamond. The cubic form has the sphalerite crystal structure (space group = F3m), the same as that of diamond (with ordered B and N atoms), and is also called β-BN or c-BN.

Wurtzite form (w-BN) 
The wurtzite form of boron nitride (w-BN; point group = C6v; space group = P63mc) has the same structure as lonsdaleite, a rare hexagonal polymorph of carbon. As in the cubic form, the boron and nitrogen atoms are grouped into tetrahedra. In the wurtzite form, the boron and nitrogen atoms are grouped into 6-membered rings. In the cubic form all rings are in the chair configuration, whereas in w-BN the rings between 'layers' are in boat configuration. Earlier optimistic reports predicted that the wurtzite form was very strong, and was estimated by a simulation as potentially having a strength 18% stronger than that of diamond. Since only small amounts of the mineral exist in nature, this has not yet been experimentally verified. Its hardness is 46 GPa, slightly harder than commercial borides but softer than the cubic form of boron nitride.

Properties

Physical

The partly ionic structure of BN layers in h-BN reduces covalency and electrical conductivity, whereas the interlayer interaction increases resulting in higher hardness of h-BN relative to graphite. The reduced electron-delocalization in hexagonal-BN is also indicated by its absence of color and a large band gap. Very different bonding – strong covalent within the basal planes (planes where boron and nitrogen atoms are covalently bonded) and weak between them – causes high anisotropy of most properties of h-BN.

For example, the hardness, electrical and thermal conductivity are much higher within the planes than perpendicular to them. On the contrary, the properties of c-BN and w-BN are more homogeneous and isotropic.

Those materials are extremely hard, with the hardness of bulk c-BN being slightly smaller and w-BN even higher than that of diamond. Polycrystalline c-BN with grain sizes on the order of 10 nm is also reported to have Vickers hardness comparable or higher than diamond. Because of much better stability to heat and transition metals, c-BN surpasses diamond in mechanical applications, such as machining steel. The thermal conductivity of BN is among the highest of all electric insulators (see table).

Boron nitride can be doped p-type with beryllium and n-type with boron, sulfur, silicon or if co-doped with carbon and nitrogen. Both hexagonal and cubic BN are wide-gap semiconductors with a band-gap energy corresponding to the UV region. If voltage is applied to h-BN or c-BN, then it emits UV light in the range 215–250 nm and therefore can potentially be used as light-emitting diodes (LEDs) or lasers.

Little is known on melting behavior of boron nitride. It sublimates at 2973 °C at normal pressure releasing nitrogen gas and boron, but melts at elevated pressure.

Thermal stability
Hexagonal and cubic BN (and probably w-BN) show remarkable chemical and thermal stabilities. For example, h-BN is stable to decomposition at temperatures up to 1000 °C in air, 1400 °C in vacuum, and 2800 °C in an inert atmosphere. The reactivity of h-BN and c-BN is relatively similar, and the data for c-BN are summarized in the table below. 

Thermal stability of c-BN can be summarized as follows:
 In air or oxygen:  protective layer prevents further oxidation to ~1300 °C; no conversion to hexagonal form at 1400 °C.
 In nitrogen: some conversion to h-BN at 1525 °C after 12 h.
 In vacuum: conversion to h-BN at 1550–1600 °C.

Chemical stability

Thermal conductivity
The theoretical thermal conductivity of hexagonal boron nitride nanoribbons (BNNRs) can approach 1700–2000 W/(m⋅K), which has the same order of magnitude as the experimental measured value for graphene, and can be comparable to the theoretical calculations for graphene nanoribbons. Moreover, the thermal transport in the BNNRs is anisotropic. The thermal conductivity of zigzag-edged BNNRs is about 20% larger than that of armchair-edged nanoribbons at room temperature.

Natural occurrence
In 2009, a naturally occurring boron nitride mineral in the cubic form (c-BN) was reported in Tibet, and the name qingsongite proposed. The substance was found in dispersed micron-sized inclusions in chromium-rich rocks. In 2013, the International Mineralogical Association affirmed the mineral and the name.

Synthesis

Preparation and reactivity of hexagonal BN
Boron nitride is produced synthetically. Hexagonal boron nitride is obtained by the reacting boron trioxide or boric acid with ammonia or urea in a nitrogen atmosphere:

 (T = 900 °C)
 (T = 900 °C)
 (T > 1000 °C)
 (T > 1500 °C)

The resulting disordered (amorphous) boron nitride contains 92–95% BN and 5–8% . The remaining  can be evaporated in a second step at temperatures  in order to achieve BN concentration >98%. Such annealing also crystallizes BN, the size of the crystallites increasing with the annealing temperature.

h-BN parts can be fabricated inexpensively by hot-pressing with subsequent machining. The parts are made from boron nitride powders adding boron oxide for better compressibility. Thin films of boron nitride can be obtained by chemical vapor deposition from boron trichloride and nitrogen precursors. Combustion of boron powder in nitrogen plasma at 5500 °C yields ultrafine boron nitride used for lubricants and toners.

Boron nitride reacts with iodine fluoride in trichlorofluoromethane at −30 °C to produce an extremely sensitive contact explosive, in low yield.
Boron nitride reacts with nitrides of lithium, alkaline earth metals and lanthanides to form nitridoborate compounds. For example:

Intercalation of hexagonal BN

Both experiment and theory suggest the intercalation is much more difficult for BN than for graphite.

Preparation of cubic BN
Synthesis of c-BN uses same methods as that of diamond: cubic boron nitride is produced by treating hexagonal boron nitride at high pressure and temperature, much as synthetic diamond is produced from graphite. Direct conversion of hexagonal boron nitride to the cubic form has been observed at pressures between 5 and 18 GPa and temperatures between 1730 and 3230 °C, that is similar parameters as for direct graphite-diamond conversion. The addition of a small amount of boron oxide can lower the required pressure to 4–7 GPa and temperature to 1500 °C. As in diamond synthesis, to further reduce the conversion pressures and temperatures, a catalyst is added, such as lithium, potassium, or magnesium, their nitrides, their fluoronitrides, water with ammonium compounds, or hydrazine. Other industrial synthesis methods, again borrowed from diamond growth, use crystal growth in a temperature gradient, or explosive shock wave. The shock wave method is used to produce material called heterodiamond, a superhard compound of boron, carbon, and nitrogen.

Low-pressure deposition of thin films of cubic boron nitride is possible. As in diamond growth, the major problem is to suppress the growth of hexagonal phases (h-BN or graphite, respectively). Whereas in diamond growth this is achieved by adding hydrogen gas, boron trifluoride is used for c-BN. Ion beam deposition, plasma-enhanced chemical vapor deposition, pulsed laser deposition, reactive sputtering, and other physical vapor deposition methods are used as well.

Preparation of wurtzite BN
Wurtzite BN can be obtained via static high-pressure or dynamic shock methods. The limits of its stability are not well defined. Both c-BN and w-BN are formed by compressing h-BN, but formation of w-BN occurs at much lower temperatures close to 1700 °C.

Production statistics
Whereas the production and consumption figures for the raw materials used for BN synthesis, namely boric acid and boron trioxide, are well known (see boron), the corresponding numbers for the boron nitride are not listed in statistical reports. An estimate for the 1999 world production is 300 to 350 metric tons. The major producers and consumers of BN are located in the United States, Japan, China and Germany. In 2000, prices varied from about $75–120/kg for standard industrial-quality h-BN and were about up to $200–400/kg for high purity BN grades.

Applications

Hexagonal BN

Hexagonal BN (h-BN) is the most widely used polymorph. It is a good lubricant at both low and high temperatures (up to 900 °C, even in an oxidizing atmosphere). h-BN lubricant is particularly useful when the electrical conductivity or chemical reactivity of graphite (alternative lubricant) would be problematic. In internal combustion engines, where graphite could be oxidized and turn into carbon sludge, h-BN with its superior thermal stability can be added to engine lubricant, however, with all nano-particles suspension, Brownian-motion settlement is a key problem and settlement can clog engine oil filters, which limits solid lubricants application in a combustion engine to only automotive race settings, where engine re-building is a common practice. Since carbon has appreciable solubility in certain alloys (such as steels), which may lead to degradation of properties, BN is often superior for high temperature and/or high pressure applications. Another advantage of h-BN over graphite is that its lubricity does not require water or gas molecules trapped between the layers. Therefore, h-BN lubricants can be used even in vacuum, e.g. in space applications. The lubricating properties of fine-grained h-BN are used in cosmetics, paints, dental cements, and pencil leads.

Hexagonal BN was first used in cosmetics around 1940 in Japan. However, because of its high price, h-BN was soon abandoned for this application. Its use was revitalized in the late 1990s with the optimization h-BN production processes, and currently h-BN is used by nearly all leading producers of cosmetic products for foundations, make-up, eye shadows, blushers, kohl pencils, lipsticks and other skincare products.

Because of its excellent thermal and chemical stability, boron nitride ceramics are traditionally used as parts of high-temperature equipment. h-BN can be included in ceramics, alloys, resins, plastics, rubbers, and other materials, giving them self-lubricating properties. Such materials are suitable for construction of e.g. bearings and in steelmaking. Plastics filled with BN have less thermal expansion as well as higher thermal conductivity and electrical resistivity. Due to its excellent dielectric and thermal properties, BN is used in electronics e.g. as a substrate for semiconductors, microwave-transparent windows, as a heat conductive yet electrically insulating filler in thermal pastes, and as a structural material for seals. Many quantum devices use multilayer h-BN as a substrate material. It can also be used as a dielectric in resistive random access memories.

Hexagonal BN is used in xerographic process and laser printers as a charge leakage barrier layer of the photo drum. In the automotive industry, h-BN mixed with a binder (boron oxide) is used for sealing oxygen sensors, which provide feedback for adjusting fuel flow. The binder utilizes the unique temperature stability and insulating properties of h-BN.

Parts can be made by hot pressing from four commercial grades of h-BN. Grade HBN contains a boron oxide binder; it is usable up to 550–850 °C in oxidizing atmosphere and up to 1600 °C in vacuum, but due to the boron oxide content is sensitive to water. Grade HBR uses a calcium borate binder and is usable at 1600 °C. Grades HBC and HBT contain no binder and can be used up to 3000 °C.

Boron nitride nanosheets (h-BN) can be deposited by catalytic decomposition of borazine at a temperature ~1100 °C in a chemical vapor deposition setup, over areas up to about 10 cm2. Owing to their hexagonal atomic structure, small lattice mismatch with graphene (~2%), and high uniformity they are used as substrates for graphene-based devices. BN nanosheets are also excellent proton conductors. Their high proton transport rate, combined with the high electrical resistance, may lead to applications in fuel cells and water electrolysis.

h-BN has been used since the mid-2000s as a bullet and bore lubricant in precision target rifle applications as an alternative to molybdenum disulfide coating, commonly referred to as "moly". It is claimed to increase effective barrel life, increase intervals between bore cleaning, and decrease the deviation in point of impact between clean bore first shots and subsequent shots.

Cubic BN
Cubic boron nitride (CBN or c-BN) is widely used as an abrasive. Its usefulness arises from its insolubility in iron, nickel, and related alloys at high temperatures, whereas diamond is soluble in these metals. Polycrystalline c-BN (PCBN) abrasives are therefore used for machining steel, whereas diamond abrasives are preferred for aluminum alloys, ceramics, and stone. When in contact with oxygen at high temperatures, BN forms a passivation layer of boron oxide. Boron nitride binds well with metals, due to formation of interlayers of metal borides or nitrides. Materials with cubic boron nitride crystals are often used in the tool bits of cutting tools. For grinding applications, softer binders, e.g. resin, porous ceramics, and soft metals, are used. Ceramic binders can be used as well. Commercial products are known under names "Borazon" (by Hyperion Materials & Technologies), and "Elbor" or "Cubonite" (by Russian vendors).

Contrary to diamond, large c-BN pellets can be produced in a simple process (called sintering) of annealing c-BN powders in nitrogen flow at temperatures slightly below the BN decomposition temperature. This ability of c-BN and h-BN powders to fuse allows cheap production of large BN parts.

Similar to diamond, the combination in c-BN of highest thermal conductivity and electrical resistivity is ideal for heat spreaders.

As cubic boron nitride consists of light atoms and is very robust chemically and mechanically, it is one of the popular materials for X-ray membranes: low mass results in small X-ray absorption, and good mechanical properties allow usage of thin membranes, thus further reducing the absorption.

Amorphous BN
Layers of amorphous boron nitride (a-BN) are used in some semiconductor devices, e.g. MOSFETs. They can be prepared by chemical decomposition of trichloroborazine with caesium, or by thermal chemical vapor deposition methods. Thermal CVD can be also used for deposition of h-BN layers, or at high temperatures, c-BN.

Other forms of boron nitride

Atomically thin boron nitride 

Hexagonal boron nitride can be exfoliated to mono or few atomic layer sheets. Due to its analogous structure to that of graphene, atomically thin boron nitride is sometimes called white graphene.

Mechanical properties
Atomically thin boron nitride is one of the strongest electrically insulating materials. Monolayer boron nitride has an average Young's modulus of 0.865TPa and fracture strength of 70.5GPa, and in contrast to graphene, whose strength decreases dramatically with increased thickness, few-layer boron nitride sheets have a strength similar to that of monolayer boron nitride.

Thermal conductivity
Atomically thin boron nitride has one of the highest thermal conductivity coefficients (751 W/mK at room temperature) among semiconductors and electrical insulators, and its thermal conductivity increases with reduced thickness due to less intra-layer coupling.

Thermal stability
The air stability of graphene shows a clear thickness dependence: monolayer graphene is reactive to oxygen at 250 °C, strongly doped at 300 °C, and etched at 450 °C; in contrast, bulk graphite is not oxidized until 800 °C. Atomically thin boron nitride has much better oxidation resistance than graphene. Monolayer boron nitride is not oxidized till 700 °C and can sustain up to 850 °C in air; bilayer and trilayer boron nitride nanosheets have slightly higher oxidation starting temperatures. The excellent thermal stability, high impermeability to gas and liquid, and electrical insulation make atomically thin boron nitride potential coating materials for preventing surface oxidation and corrosion of metals and other two-dimensional (2D) materials, such as black phosphorus.

Better surface adsorption
Atomically thin boron nitride has been found to have better surface adsorption capabilities than bulk hexagonal boron nitride. According to theoretical and experimental studies, atomically thin boron nitride as an adsorbent experiences conformational changes upon surface adsorption of molecules, increasing adsorption energy and efficiency. The synergic effect of the atomic thickness, high flexibility, stronger surface adsorption capability, electrical insulation, impermeability, high thermal and chemical stability of BN nanosheets can increase the Raman sensitivity by up to two orders, and in the meantime attain long-term stability and extraordinary reusability not achievable by other materials.

Dielectric properties
Atomically thin hexagonal boron nitride is an excellent dielectric substrate for graphene, molybdenum disulfide, and many other 2D material-based electronic and photonic devices. As shown by electric force microscopy (EFM) studies, the electric field screening in atomically thin boron nitride shows a weak dependence on thickness, which is in line with the smooth decay of electric field inside few-layer boron nitride revealed by the first-principles calculations.

Raman characteristics
Raman spectroscopy has been a useful tool to study a variety of 2D materials, and the Raman signature of high-quality atomically thin boron nitride was first reported by Gorbachev et al. in 2011. and Li et al. However, the two reported Raman results of monolayer boron nitride did not agree with each other. Cai et al., therefore, conducted systematic experimental and theoretical studies to reveal the intrinsic Raman spectrum of atomically thin boron nitride. It reveals that atomically thin boron nitride without interaction with a substrate has a G band frequency similar to that of bulk hexagonal boron nitride, but strain induced by the substrate can cause Raman shifts. Nevertheless, the Raman intensity of G band of atomically thin boron nitride can be used to estimate layer thickness and sample quality.

Boron nitride nanomesh

Boron nitride nanomesh is a nanostructured two-dimensional material. It consists of a single BN layer, which forms by self-assembly a highly regular mesh after high-temperature exposure of a clean rhodium or ruthenium surface to borazine under ultra-high vacuum. The nanomesh looks like an assembly of hexagonal pores. The distance between two pore centers is 3.2 nm and the pore diameter is ~2 nm. Other terms for this material are boronitrene or white graphene.

The boron nitride nanomesh is not only stable to decomposition under vacuum, air and some liquids, but also up to temperatures of 800 °C. In addition, it shows the extraordinary ability to trap molecules and metallic clusters which have similar sizes to the nanomesh pores, forming a well-ordered array. These characteristics promise interesting applications of the nanomesh in areas like catalysis, surface functionalisation, spintronics, quantum computing and data storage media like hard drives.

Boron nitride nanotubes
 Boron nitride tubules were first made in 1989 by Shore and Dolan This work was patented in 1989 and published in 1989 thesis (Dolan) and then 1993 Science. The 1989 work was also the first preparation of amorphous BN by B-trichloroborazine and cesium metal.

Boron nitride nanotubes were predicted in 1994 and experimentally discovered in 1995. They can be imagined as a rolled up sheet of h-boron nitride. Structurally, it is a close analog of the carbon nanotube, namely a long cylinder with diameter of several to hundred nanometers and length of many micrometers, except carbon atoms are alternately substituted by nitrogen and boron atoms. However, the properties of BN nanotubes are very different: whereas carbon nanotubes can be metallic or semiconducting depending on the rolling direction and radius, a BN nanotube is an electrical insulator with a bandgap of ~5.5 eV, basically independent of tube chirality and morphology. In addition, a layered BN structure is much more thermally and chemically stable than a graphitic carbon structure.

Boron nitride aerogel

Boron nitride aerogel is an aerogel made of highly porous BN. It typically consists of a mixture of deformed BN nanotubes and nanosheets. It can have a density as low as 0.6 mg/cm3 and a specific surface area as high as 1050 m2/g, and therefore has potential applications as an absorbent, catalyst support and gas storage medium. BN aerogels are highly hydrophobic and can absorb up to 160 times their weight in oil. They are resistant to oxidation in air at temperatures up to 1200 °C, and hence can be reused after the absorbed oil is burned out by flame. BN aerogels can be prepared by template-assisted chemical vapor deposition using borazine as the feed gas.

Composites containing BN
Addition of boron nitride to silicon nitride ceramics improves the thermal shock resistance of the resulting material. For the same purpose, BN is added also to silicon nitride-alumina and titanium nitride-alumina ceramics. Other materials being reinforced with BN include alumina and zirconia, borosilicate glasses, glass ceramics, enamels, and composite ceramics with titanium boride-boron nitride, titanium boride-aluminium nitride-boron nitride, and silicon carbide-boron nitride composition.

Health issues
The maximum concentration recommended for nitrides of nonmetals is 10 mg/m3 for BN and 4 for AlN or ZrN.

See also
 Beta carbon nitride
 Borazon
 Borocarbonitrides
 Boron suboxide
 Superhard materials
 Wide-bandgap semiconductors

Notes

References

External links

National Pollutant Inventory: Boron and Compounds
Materials Safety Data Sheet at University of Oxford

Boron compounds
Ceramic materials
Nitrides
III-V semiconductors
Non-petroleum based lubricants
Dry lubricants
Abrasives
Superhard materials
Neutron poisons
Monolayers
III-V compounds
Boron–nitrogen compounds
Zincblende crystal structure
Wurtzite structure type